Hays USD 489 is a public unified school district headquartered in Hays, Kansas, United States.  The district includes the communities of Hays, Schoenchen, Antonino, Catharine, Munjor, and nearby rural areas.

Schools
The school district operates the following schools:
 Hays High School
 Hays Middle School
 Lincoln Elementary School
 O'Loughlin Elementary School
 Roosevelt Elementary School
 Wilson Elementary School

See also
 Kansas State Department of Education
 Kansas State High School Activities Association
 List of high schools in Kansas
 List of unified school districts in Kansas

References

External links
 

School districts in Kansas
Education in Ellis County, Kansas